In cinematic parlance, a film in its first run has been recently  released. In North America, new films attract the majority of their theatrical viewers in the first few weeks after their release. In North America, different movie theatres pay different rates to show films depending on how recently they have been released.  In 1946, the Supreme Court of the United States found major film distributors in violation of antitrust laws when they precluded independent theaters from screening first-run films.

Some older, smaller, or poorly outfitted neighborhood or  discount theatres, or those in less desirable locations, specialize in showing films during their second run. These theatres get to keep a larger share of the ticket fees and often charge a lower ticket price.

See also
 Direct-to-video
 First-run syndication

References

Film and video terminology